Busigny is a railway station serving the town Busigny, Nord department, northern France. It is situated on the Creil–Jeumont railway.

The station is served by regional trains to Cambrai, Amiens, Saint-Quentin and Maubeuge.

References

Railway stations in Nord (French department)
Railway stations in France opened in 1855